The Aarhus Protocol on Persistent Organic Pollutants, a 1998 protocol on persistent organic pollutants (POPs), is an addition to the 1979 Geneva Convention on Long-Range Transboundary Air Pollution (LRTAP). The Protocol seeks "to control, reduce or eliminate discharge, emissions and losses of persistent organic pollutants" in Europe, some former Soviet Union countries, and the United States, in order to reduce their transboundary fluxes so as to protect human health and the environment from adverse effects.

Authors and promoters of the Protocol were the United Nations Economic Commission for Europe (UNECE), which at the time housed 53 different country members and alliance.   The protocol was amended on 18 December 2009, but the amended version has not yet come into force.

As of May 2013, the protocol has been ratified by 31 states and the European Union.

In the United States, the protocol is an executive agreement that does not require Senate approval. However, legislation is needed to resolve inconsistencies between provisions of the protocol and existing U.S. laws (specifically the Toxic Substances Control Act and the Federal Insecticide, Fungicide, and Rodenticide Act).

Substances 
The following substances are contained in the CLRTAP POPs Protocol.  The document focuses on a list of 16 substances that have been singled out according to agreed risk criteria (comprising eleven pesticides, two industrial chemicals and three by-products/contaminants). The Protocol assigned the arrangements for proper disposal of waste products deemed banned and limited, including medical supplies.

See also 
 Convention on Long-Range Transboundary Air Pollution
 Stockholm Convention on Persistent Organic Pollutants
 Environmental agreements
 International POPs Elimination Network (IPEN)

References

External links
Original text
Overview - United Nations Economic Commission for Europe webpage
Amended text (April 2010)
Signatures and ratifications

Biodegradable waste management
Waste treaties
Treaties concluded in 1998
1998 in Denmark
Treaties of Austria
Treaties of Belgium
Treaties of Bulgaria
Treaties of Canada
Treaties of Croatia
Treaties of Cyprus
Treaties of the Czech Republic
Treaties of Denmark
Treaties of Estonia
Treaties of Finland
Treaties of France
Treaties of Germany
Treaties of Hungary
Treaties of Iceland
Treaties of Italy
Treaties of Latvia
Treaties of Liechtenstein
Treaties of Lithuania
Treaties of Luxembourg
Treaties of Montenegro
Treaties of the Netherlands
Treaties of Norway
Treaties of Moldova
Treaties of Romania
Treaties of Serbia
Treaties of Slovakia
Treaties of Slovenia
Treaties of Spain
Treaties of Sweden
Treaties of Switzerland
Treaties of the United Kingdom
Treaties entered into by the European Union
Convention on Long-Range Transboundary Air Pollution
Treaties extended to the Faroe Islands
Treaties extended to Greenland
United Nations Economic Commission for Europe treaties
Environmental treaties
Air pollution
Treaties entered into force in 2003
2003 in the environment
Treaties of North Macedonia